Maria Nur Rowshon (as known as Maria Nur) is a Bangladeshi television presenter, actor and model. She entered in show business as a radio jockey and then became a TV host.

Early life
Maria was born in Dhaka. Maria completed her Secondary education from Lalmatia Girls High School & Higher Secondary from Mohammadpur Preparatory School & College. She completed her graduation from Dhaka City College in accounting and did a diploma in fashion designing from Shanto-Mariam University of Creative Technology.

Career
Maria Nur Rowshon started her career at ABC Radio in 2009 as a Radio Jockey (RJ). She entered in television media from 2012. In 2014, she came in limelight with Mostofa Sarwar Farooqi's television commercial for ekhanei.com. She won Babisas Award in "Best Model" category for her performance in the TVC series as a lead role.

Maria started her career in television with anchoring. She hosted more than 20 different television shows. She gained popularity as a host for sport shows during T20 World Cup 2014. She also acted in several fictions as the lead role including Five Female Friends, Jhalmuri, Dampotto, Lux Bhalobashar Shourobh-er Golpo.

Television

TV fictions

TV commercials

References

External links
 Facebook
 Instagram

Living people
People from Dhaka
1987 births
21st-century Bangladeshi actresses
Bangladeshi television actresses
Bangladeshi female models